This is a timeline documenting the events of heavy metal in the year 1997.

Newly formed bands 

1349 
Akercocke
Aletheian
The Amenta
American Head Charge
Amoral
Armageddon
Atargatis
Blackstar
Blood Has Been Shed
Born from Pain
 Brougham
Caliban 
Carnal Forge
Dagoba
Dark Lunacy
Dark Suns
Deadlock 
 The Dillinger Escape Plan
Dir En Grey
Dolorian
Doomsword
Dope 
 Droid
 Elvenking
Explorers Club
 Factory 81
 Finntroll
 Five Foot Thick
Forefather
Goatwhore
Gorod 
 Halestorm
Halfcocked
Hardcore Superstar
Hate Eternal
Insomnium
 Isis
Karma to Burn
Karnivool
Keelhaul
Liquid Tension Experiment
 Lostprophets
Nebula
Nonpoint
Norma Jean 
 Onesidezero
Origin 
Paysage d'Hiver
Persuader
 Pig Destroyer
 Pleymo
Poison the Well 
 Primal Fear
 Primer 55
 Pulse Ultra
Rapture 
Secret Sphere
Severe Torture
 Shuvel
Sinergy
Skrape (As JoJo)
Soil 
Soulfly
 Sunk Loto (As Messiah)
 Spawn of Possession
 Taproot
Three Days Grace
 Throwdown
Thurisaz
Tierra Santa
 Turisas
Underoath
Vesania
 Vintersorg
Witchery

Reformed Bands 
 The original Black Sabbath line up
 Jane's Addiction (disbanded again later that year)
 Ratt
 Suicidal Tendencies

Albums

 20 Dead Flower Children – Candy Toy Guns and Television
 Acid King – Down with the Crown (EP)
 Aerosmith – Nine Lives
 Alice Cooper – A Fistful of Alice (live)
 Anvil - Absolutely No Alternative
 Arcturus – La Masquerade Infernale
 Assück - Misery Index
 Belphegor – Blutsabbath
 Blackstar - Barbed Wire Soul
 Blood of Christ - ...A Dream to Remember
 Body Count – Violent Demise: The Last Days
 Borknagar – The Olden Domain
 Bruce Dickinson – Accident of Birth
 Brutal Truth - Sounds of the Animal Kingdom
 Children of Bodom – Something Wild (Finland release)
 Cinderella – Once Upon A...
 Clawfinger – Clawfinger
 Coal Chamber – Coal Chamber
 Conception – Flow
 Creed – My Own Prison
 The Crown - Eternal Death
 D.A.D. – Simpatico
 Damaged - Token Remedies Research
 Dark Tranquillity – The Mind's I
 Deceased - Fearless Undead Machines
 Deftones – Around the Fur
 Deicide – Serpents of the Light
 Devin Townsend – Ocean Machine: Biomech
 The Dillinger Escape Plan – The Dillinger Escape Plan (EP)
 Dimmu Borgir – Enthrone Darkness Triumphant
 Dismember - Death Metal
 Dokken – Shadowlife
 Dream Theater – Falling into Infinity
 Ebony Tears – Tortura Insomniae
 Edguy – Kingdom of Madness
 Edge of Sanity - Infernal
 Edge of Sanity - Cryptic
 Electric Wizard – Come My Fanatics...
 Emperor – Anthems to the Welkin at Dusk
 Enslaved - Eld
 Entombed – To Ride Shoot Straight and Speak the Truth
 Europe – Definitive Collection (compilation)
 Faith No More – Album of the Year
 Fates Warning – A Pleasant Shade of Gray
 Freak Kitchen – Junk Tooth (EP)
 Gamma Ray – Somewhere Out in Space
 The Gathering - Nighttime Birds
 Geezer – Black Science
 Gilby Clarke – The Hangover (Gilby Clarke album)
 Godflesh – Love and Hate in Dub (remix)
 Godsmack - All Wound Up...
 Gorgoroth - Under the Sign of Hell
 Graveworm – When Daylight's Gone
 Grip Inc. – Nemesis
 Grinspoon - Guide to Better Living
 Grinspoon - Repeat (EP)
 Gwar – Carnival of Chaos 
 HammerFall – Glory to the Brave
 Handsome - Handsome
 Hatebreed – Satisfaction Is the Death of Desire
 Hed PE – (həd)pe
 Helmet – Aftertaste
 HIM – Greatest Lovesongs Vol. 666
 Hypocrisy – The Final Chapter
 Iced Earth – Days of Purgatory (remix)
 Illdisposed – There's Something Rotten... In the State of Denmark
 Immortal – Blizzard Beasts
 In Flames – Whoracle
 Incantation - The Forsaken Mourning of Angelic Anguish (EP)
 Incantation – Tribute to the Goat (live)
 Incubus – Enjoy Incubus (EP)
 Incubus – S.C.I.E.N.C.E.
 Integrity – Seasons in the Size of Days
 Iron Savior – Iron Savior
 Jag Panzer – The Fourth Judgement
 Jane's Addiction – Kettle Whistle (compilation)
 Judas Priest – Jugulator
 Kamelot – Dominion
 Kiss – Carnival of Souls: The Final Sessions
 Konkhra - Weed Out the Weak
 Krabathor - Mortal Memories (EP)
 Kreator – Outcast
 Lacrimosa – Stille
 L7 – The Beauty Process: Triple Platinum
 Limp Bizkit – Three Dollar Bill, Y'all$
 Yngwie Malmsteen – Facing the Animal
 Machine Head – The More Things Change...
 Malevolent Creation - In Cold Blood
 Marilyn Manson – Remix & Repent (EP)
 Megadeth – Cryptic Writings
 Memento Mori – Songs for the Apocalypse, Vol. 4
 Metallica – ReLoad
 Morgion - Among Majestic Ruin
 Mötley Crüe – Generation Swine
 Mudvayne – Kill, I Oughtta (EP)
 Napalm Death - Inside the Torn Apart
 Necrophobic - Darkside
 Nembrionic - Bloodcult (EP)
 Neuraxis - Imagery
 Night in Gales - Towards the Twilight
 Nightwish – Angels Fall First
 Nothingface – Pacifier
 No-Big-Silence – 99
 Novembers Doom - For Every Leaf That Falls (EP)
 Obituary - Back from the Dead
 Old Man's Child – The Pagan Prosperity
 Orange Goblin – Frequencies from Planet Ten
 Overkill – From the Underground and Below
 Ozzy Osbourne – The Ozzman Cometh
 Pain - Pain
 Pantera – Official Live: 101 Proof (live)
 Pessimist - Cult of the Initiated
 Pig Destroyer – Demo (EP)
 Pig Destroyer – Pig Destroyer / Orchid (split EP)
 Primus – Brown Album
 Queensrÿche – Hear in the Now Frontier
 Rammstein – Sehnsucht
 Razor – Decibels
 Rhapsody – Legendary Tales
 Rollins Band – Come In and Burn
 Rotting Christ – A Dead Poem
 Roxx Gang – Love 'Em and Leave 'Em
 Savatage – The Wake of Magellan
 Saxon – Unleash the Beast
 Scorpions – Deadly Sting: The Mercury Years
 Septicflesh - The Ophidian Wheel
 Sevendust – Sevendust
 Shadows Fall – Somber Eyes to the Sky
 Six Feet Under - Warpath
 Skinlab – Bound, Gagged and Blindfolded
 Slaughter – Revolution
 Slaves on Dope – One Good Turn Deserves Another
 Snot – Get Some
 Sodom – 'Til Death Do Us Unite
 Solefald – The Linear Scaffold
 Soundgarden – A-Sides
 Strapping Young Lad – City
 Stratovarius – Visions
 Stratovarius – The Past and Now (compilation)
 Symphony X – The Divine Wings of Tragedy
 Tad Morose – A Mended Rhyme
 The 3rd and the Mortal – In This Room
 The Newlydeads – The Newlydeads
 Therion - A'arab Zaraq – Lucid Dreaming
 U.D.O. – Solid
 Unleashed - Warrior
 Vader – Black to the Blind
 Vital Remains – Forever Underground
 Warrant – Warrant Live 86–97 (live)
 Whitesnake – Restless Heart
 Within Temptation – Enter
 W.A.S.P. – Kill Fuck Die
 Y&T – Endangered Species
 Zimmers Hole - Bound by Fire

Disbandments 
 Acid Bath
 Jane's Addiction (reformed in 2001)
 Rollins Band (reformed in 1999)
 Soundgarden (reformed in 2010)
 X Japan (reformed in 2007)

Events 
 Mötley Crüe and former vocalist Vince Neil reconcile their differences, and Neil rejoins the band.
 Black Sabbath reunites with the original line-up between Black Sabbath and Never Say Die!.
 Bassist Mooseman leaves Body Count and is replaced by Griz. Meanwhile, the late drummer Beatmaster V is replaced by O.T.
 After a two-year hiatus, vocalist Mike Muir and rhythm guitarist Mike Clark reform Suicidal Tendencies. Rocky George and Robert Trujillo are replaced by Dean Pleasants and Josh Paul on guitar and bass respectively, and future Bad Religion drummer Brooks Wackerman also joins.
The Mentors frontman, El Duce, is killed when hit by a train.
 Former Slipknot vocalist, Anders Colsefni, is replaced with current lead singer of Slipknot, Corey Taylor.

References

1990s in heavy metal music
Metal